Live at the Roxy is a live album by Pete Yorn, recorded at The Roxy Theatre in Los Angeles on June 14, 2001.  The album contains live versions of several songs from his debut album Musicforthemorningafter, as well as covers of Bruce Springsteen's "Dancing in the Dark" and "Panic" by The Smiths.

The album was distributed only through independent music retail outlets in 2001 and is currently out of print.

Track listing
All tracks composed by Pete Yorn; except where indicated
"Dancing in the Dark/Murray" (Bruce Springsteen) – 6:05
"For Nancy ('Cos It Already Is)" – 3:39
"Strange Condition" – 4:12
"Black" – 4:50
"Sense" – 5:01
"Closet" – 4:09
"On Your Side" – 5:09
"Simonize" – 4:07 
"Panic/Life on a Chain" (Morrissey, Johnny Marr) – 7:13

Pete Yorn albums
2001 live albums
Columbia Records live albums
Albums recorded at the Roxy Theatre